Sharifabad-e Zand (also Romanized as Sharīfābād-e Zand; also known as Sharīfābād and Sharīfābād-e Zarand) is a village in Jafarabad Rural District, Jafarabad District, Qom County, Qom Province, Iran. At the 2006 census, its population was 329, in 85 families.

References 

Populated places in Qom Province